The 1999 Norwegian Football Cup the 94th edition of the Norwegian Football Cup. The Cup was won by Rosenborg after beating Brann in the cup final with the score 2–0. This was Rosenborg's eighth Norwegian Cup title.

Calendar
Below are the dates for each round as given by the official schedule:

First round
The First round was played on 4 May and 5 May. Two 1. divisjon sides, Eik-Tønsberg and Skjetten was eliminated in this round.

|colspan="3" style="background-color:#97DEFF"|4 May 1999

|-
|colspan="3" style="background-color:#97DEFF"|5 May 1999

|}

Second round

|colspan="3" style="background-color:#97DEFF"|19 May 1999

|-
|colspan="3" style="background-color:#97DEFF"|20 May 1999

|-
|colspan="3" style="background-color:#97DEFF"|21 May 1999

|-
|colspan="3" style="background-color:#97DEFF"|8 June 1999

|-
|colspan="3" style="background-color:#97DEFF"|9 June 1999

|}

Third round

Fourth round

Quarter-finals

Semi-finals

Final

References

External links 
http://www.rsssf.no

Norwegian Football Cup seasons
Norway
Football Cup